This is a list of airports in North Korea. North Korea is a country in Northeast Asia, which may have as many as 78 usable airfields, although the state's secrecy makes it difficult to ascertain their number and condition with certainty. 

The state carrier, Air Koryo, joined the International Air Transport Association (IATA) in the late 1990s, and North Korea has proclaimed a program to upgrade several airports to international standards.  However, with the exception of Pyongyang Sunan International Airport and a few that receive irregular service by Air Koryo, commercial aviation in North Korea is practically non-existent and most airfields appear to be military use.

Hard surface airports

Public airports

Military airports

Air bases
 Hwangju Airport  U/I fighter regiment with 44 MiG-19
 Hwangsuwon Airport  U/I fighter regiment with 44 MiG-21
 Iwon Airport  U/I fighter regiment with 38 MiG-21
 Kalma Airport U/I fighter regiment with 72 MiG-19
 Koksan Airport  U/I fighter regiment with 24 MiG-21
 Kwail Airport  U/I fighter regiment with 44 MiG-21
 Kwaksan Airport  U/I bomber regiment with 24 Il-28
 Orang Airport  U/I fighter regiment with 44 MiG-19
 Pukch'ang Airport  U/I fighter regiment with 36 SU-25 and 24 MiG-29
 Sondok Airport U/I bomber regiment with 24 Il-28
 Sunchon Airport U/I fighter regiment with 46 MiG-23
 Toksan Airport U/I bomber regiment with 24 Il-28
 Yonpo Airfield U/I unit with An-2s

Non-hard surface airports
 Chik-Tong Airport
 Ch'o do Airport
 Haeju Airport
 Hoeyang Southeast Airport
 Hyesan Airport
 Ichon Airport
 Ichon Northeast Airport
 Ihyon Airport
 Kuktong Airport
 Kumgang Airport
 Maengsan Airport
 Manpo Airport
 Ongjin Airport
 Paegam Airport
 Pyongsul Li Airport
 Sinuiju Airport
 Sohung South Airport
 Taebuko Ri Airport
 Taechon Northwest Airport
 Tanchon South Airport
 Toha Ri North Airport
 Unchon Up Airport

Highway strips

These airfields are little more than widened sections of highway that appear to be for emergency or backup use only and may not normally support operations.  They are listed as "Highway" or "Highway Strip".
 Ayang Ni
 Changyon
 Chasan
 Kang Da Ri
 Kilchu
 Kojo
 Koksan South
 Koksan South 2
 Nuchon Ni
 Okpyong Ni
 Panghyon South
 Panghyon South 2
 Pyong Ni South
 Sangwon
 Sangwon Ni
 Seanchan
 Singye
 Sinhung
 Sunan-Up
 Wong Yo Ri
 Yong Hung

Other

See also
 Transportation in North Korea
 Korean People's Air Force#Air bases
 List of airports by ICAO code: Z#ZK - North Korea
 Wikipedia: WikiProject Aviation/Airline destination lists: Asia#Korea, Democratic People's Republic of (North)

References

 Wikimapia - North Korea
 North Korea - Satellite Views
 UN location codes for KOREA, DEMOCRATIC PEOPLE'S REPUBLIC OF - includes IATA airport codes

North Korea
North Korea
 
Airports
Airports
North Korea